Pseudalsomyia is a genus of flies in the family Tachinidae.

Species
P. pilifacies Mesnil, 1968,
P. piligena Mesnil, 1968,

References

Exoristinae
Diptera of Asia
Tachinidae genera